Fences/Mansions Split 7" is a split EP by the Seattle bands Mansions and Fences, released in 2011. The split was recorded at Avast! Studios over two days.

Track listing

References

2011 EPs